The 2018 United States House of Representatives election in Delaware was held on November 6, 2018, to elect the U.S. representative from Delaware's at-large congressional district, who will represent the state of Delaware in the 116th United States Congress. The election coincided with the election of a U.S. Senator from Delaware and other federal and state offices. Democratic Congresswoman Lisa Blunt Rochester, the incumbent, won re-election.

Democratic primary
Lisa Blunt Rochester ran unopposed in the primary and automatically became the Democratic nominee.

Candidates

Nominee
 Lisa Blunt Rochester, incumbent U.S. Representative

Withdrew
 Rose Izzo, Republican candidate for the seat in 2016, 2014, and 2012 (ran for State House in district 7)

Declined
 Kerri Evelyn Harris, Dover activist and U.S. Air Force veteran (ran for U.S. Senate)

Endorsements

Republican primary

Candidates

Nominee
 Scott Walker, Republican candidate for the seat in 2016

Eliminated in primary
 Lee Murphy, retired railroad worker and actor (refused to concede)

Write-in
 Marvin Davis, far-rightist
 Lee Murphy, retired railroad worker and actor (not filed)
 Andrew Webb, community activist and student

Endorsements

Primary results

Controversy
Shortly after the final results for the Republican primary, controversy almost immediately emerged about Scott Walker’s victory, as Lee Murphy had been seen by many as the favorite to win. Murphy refused to concede and took to Facebook in saying, “Friends, thanks for all your support- something stinks here and I will not be conceding anytime soon. Need to investigate big time. A Dem wins a Republican primary?” Murphy also called for an investigation into the results. Walker responded in saying that God led his campaign to victory. Student and community activist Andrew Webb declared his Republican write-in candidacy on September 17, 2018, hoping to gain support from dissatisfied Republicans. He announced a platform of more moderate/traditional conservative ideas.

Libertarian Party

Candidates

Endorsed by Sussex County Chapter
 Andrew Webb, community activist and student (write-in)

Independent Party of Delaware

Candidates

Write-in
 Andrew Webb, community activist and student

Independents

Candidates

Declared
 Paul Johnston, veteran (write-in)

Withdrew
 Christopher Mockerman, activist (running for State House in District 17)

General election

Endorsements

Debates
 Full video of debate, University of Delaware October 17, 2018
 Full audio of debate, Delaware Public Media October 17, 2018

Predictions

Polling

with Lisa Blunt Rochester and Lee Murphy

Results

References

External links
Candidates at Vote Smart
Candidates at Ballotpedia
Campaign finance at FEC
Campaign finance at OpenSecrets

Official campaign websites
Lisa Blunt Rochester (D) for Congress
Webb for Congress

2018
Delaware
United States House of Representatives